Ambrosini is an Italian surname. Notable people with the surname include:

Abele Ambrosini (1915–1943), Italian partisan
Bartolomeo Ambrosini (1588-1657), Italian botanist, physician and naturalist
Brenno Ambrosini, Italian pianist
Carlo Ambrosini (born 1954), Italian comic book artist and writer
Cesare Ambrosini (born 1990), Italian footballer
Claudio Ambrosini (born 1948), Italian composer and conductor
Dario Ambrosini (1918–1951), Italian Grand Prix motorcycle road racer
Emilio Ambrosini (1850–1912), Italian architect
Ernesto Ambrosini (1894–1951), Italian athlete who competed mainly in the 3000 metres steeplechase
Filippo Ambrosini (born 1993), Italian pair skater
Floriano Ambrosini (1557-1621), Italian architect and engineer
Gaspare Ambrosini, (1886–1986), Italian statesman
James Ambrosini (born 1991), Australian-born Italian rugby union player
Marco Ambrosini, (born 1964), Italian composer and musician living in Germany
Maria Luisa Ambrosini, author
Mario Oriani-Ambrosini (1960–2014), Italian constitutional lawyer and politician 
Massimo Ambrosini, (born 1977), Italian footballer
Rachelina Ambrosini (1925–1941), Italian teenager who is venerated by the Roman Catholic Church
Vittorio Ambrosini (1893–1971), Italian politician

Italian-language surnames
Patronymic surnames
Surnames from given names